Fleet Week is a United States Navy, United States Marine Corps, and United States Coast Guard tradition in which active military ships recently deployed in overseas operations dock in a variety of major cities for one week. Once the ships dock, the crews can enter the city and visit its tourist attractions. At certain hours, the public can take a guided tour of the ships. Often, Fleet Week is accompanied by military demonstrations and air shows such as those provided by the Blue Angels.

History
The first Fleet Week was celebrated in San Diego, California, during the 1935 California Pacific International Exposition. The years between World War I and World War II saw an increasing military build-up in both Japan and Germany, while the communist Soviet Union (USSR) was given over to the wave of Stalinist nationalism. Most United States citizens experienced little sense of urgency about foreign developments because of isolationism and concerns with the ongoing economic Great Depression. However, then-U.S. President Franklin D. Roosevelt, a former Assistant Secretary of the Navy, was intent on expanding the U.S. Navy in response to world political trends. A major aircraft company was moving to Lindbergh Field, (today more commonly known as San Diego International Airport). In this atmosphere, Fleet Week was born.

At 11 a.m. on May 29, 1935, a color guard of the U.S. Marine Corps led a parade across Cabrillo Bridge to Plaza del Pacifico, where the U.S. flag was raised to open the Exposition officially. At 8 p.m., Roosevelt spoke by telephone and designated two selected orphans to press the buttons turning on the lights which bathed the grounds in color. In his remarks, heard over the loudspeaker system, Roosevelt said: "The decision of the people of San Diego thus to dedicate the California Pacific International Exposition is, I believe, worthy of the courage and confidence with which our people now look to the future. No one can deny that we have passed through troubled years. No one can fail to feel the inspiration of your high purpose. I wish you great success."

During Fleet Week in June 1935, 114 warships and 400 military planes arrived under command of U.S. Navy Admiral Joseph M. Reeves, Commander-in-Chief of the U.S. Fleet. It was described as the mightiest fleet ever assembled under the U.S. flag. It included forty-eight battleships, cruisers and aircraft carriers, with more than 3,000 commissioned officers and 55,000 enlisted men. The U.S. Navy men visited the Exposition and, in turn, thousands of San Diegans and other fairgoers were guests on the various ships.

San Francisco

For years it was common for several U.S. Navy ships to dock in San Francisco, California for a similar series of events. One or more fleet ships were docked as a "visit ship" for tourists to board, and the local community took in sailors for home visits; drinks were often discounted to uniformed sailors at area bars and restaurants. The highlight of the San Francisco Fleet Week is the Air Show on San Francisco Bay with the Blue Angels as the center of attention. The Air Show also features stunt planes and parachute team and coast guard demonstrations. Another highlight of the Fleet Week SF is a parade of ships under the Golden Gate Bridge.

The revived name of Fleet Week was applied to an expanded and more heavily publicized fleet visit in 1981, in conjunction with Columbus Day Weekend celebrations during the second week of October. Since then, the event has been held each year during the Columbus Day Weekend without a break and celebrated its 25th anniversary in 2005. The event is estimated to attract over one million people who watch the air show along the San Francisco Bay waterfront stretching from the Ferry Building to the Golden Gate Bridge. The event was canceled for 2013, due to federal budgetary issues., but was revived in 2014, and continues to be an annual event.

San Francisco Fleet Week 2018

Ships included:

San Francisco Fleet Week 2019

Ships included:

San Francisco Fleet Week 2021

San Francisco Fleet Week returned after 2020 was cancelled due to the COVID-19 pandemic.

Ships included:

San Francisco Fleet Week 2022

Ships included:

Port Everglades
For more than 20 years, Fleet Week Port Everglades has been produced as a signature event for South Florida each spring by Broward Navy Days, a non-profit 501(c)(3). FW PEV provides an annual opportunity for residents to honor and celebrate Sailors, Marines and Coast Guardsmen for their service to their country as well as witness first-hand the latest capabilities of today's modern navy. With the support of sponsors and assistance of hundreds of volunteers representing veterans, civic and service organizations, FW PEV offers opportunities to enjoy shore leave and participate in a wide variety of recreational, vocational and community service activities. Popular events include:

All Hands on Deck Welcoming Party, Damage Control Olympics, Community Relations Projects, Ship Tours, Celebrity Chef Luncheon, Ship Honorary Dinners, Submariners Reception, Take a Hero Fishing Tournament, Golf Tournament, Culinary Competitions, Sailor of the Year Recognition and Dignitary Reception.

The Air & Sea Show was an annual air show in Ft. Lauderdale, Florida in which military and civilian performances took place on the four mile stretch of beach from Oakland Park to Las Olas Boulevard. The show existed from 1995 until 2007.

Port Everglades Fleet Week 2018

Visiting ships included:

Port Everglades Fleet Week 2019

Visiting ships included:

Port Everglades Fleet Week 2020
On March 16, 2020, Fleet Week was cancelled due to the COVID-19 pandemic.

Port Everglades Fleet Week 2021
Fleet Week was cancelled due to the COVID-19 pandemic.

Port Everglades Fleet Week 2022
On  April 21 2022, the Navy announced visiting ships would be:

New York City

US Naval vessels had visited New York City in a celebratory manner dating back to the aftermath of the Spanish–American War in 1898, when Commodore George Dewey was celebrated as the hero of the battle of Manila Bay. However, the first official Fleet Week began in New York City in 1982. Fleet Week in New York City is generally timed to coincide with the Memorial Day holiday weekend.

During the New York City Fleet Week, ships are docked at New York Passenger Ship Terminal on the Hudson River on the West Side of the borough of Manhattan and also at Stapleton in the borough of Staten Island. In 2012, ships visited Brooklyn for the first time, docking at the Cruise Ship Terminal.

The practice of US Navy ships visiting the city and being open for tours began in 1988. NYC Fleet Week 1988 included the aircraft carrier  and battleship . Other vessels included the guided missile cruiser  and the guided missile destroyers  and  

NYC Fleet Week 1989 celebrated the bicentennial of the inauguration of President George Washington. Visiting vessels included the aircraft carrier  and the AEGIS cruiser .

NYC Fleet Week 1990 included the aircraft carrier . Fifteen Navy and Coast Guard ships were part of the celebration which included commemoration of the bicentennial of the US Coast Guard. third annual Fleet Week. Vessels included the Coast Guard training ship Eagle,

NYC Fleet Week 1991 coincided with Operation Welcome Home to commemorate military personnel returning from Operations Desert Shield and Desert Storm. Vessels included the aircraft carrier USS America, battleship , and the AEGIS cruiser .

NYC Fleet Week 1992 was held from May 20–26. It included 13 US naval ships and 7 vessels from European navies.

The US presence of 12 ships was headlined by the aircraft carrier USS John F. Kennedy. Ships at the Manhattan location included USS John F. Kennedy, . Ainsworth, rescue ship Ortolan, USS Capodanno The US Coast Guard was represented by vessels Adak, Sorrel, Staten Island, Tampa, and Wire. A Polish submarine also visited.

NYC Fleet Week 1998 was May 20–27 and included the aircraft carrier USS John F. Kennedy. NYC Fleet Week 1999 included the amphibious assault ship . NYC Fleet Week 2002 began on May 22, and was the first Fleet Week following the September 11, 2001 terrorist attacks that destroyed the World Trade Center. Thirteen U.S. Navy ships, five U.S. Coast Guard ships, one ship representing the Canadian Navy and one representing the Danish Navy sailed up the Hudson River to piers 86 and 88 near the Intrepid Sea-Air-Space Museum and to Staten Island. US ships included .

NYC Fleet Week 2003 included eighteen ships from five nations, including tall sailing ships from Mexico and India.

NYC Fleet Week 2004 included the AEGIS guided missile cruiser , and guided missile destroyer . This marked the first time the Pakistan Navy had participated.

The 2008 Fleet Week, the 21st annual observance, began May 21 and included Canadian ships in addition to U.S. ships headlined by amphibious assault ship . Other ships in the lineup included the guided missile cruisers USS Leyte Gulf and USS Monterey, and guided missile destroyers USS Nitze and USS The Sullivans. Two Canadian frigates, HMCS Toronto and HMCS St. Johns, and an oiler, HMCS Preserver, and the U.S. Coast Guard cutter Ida Lewis rounded out the lineup.

New York City Fleet Week 2009
New York City Fleet Week 2009 was May 20–26, 2009, with representatives from both the U.S. military and the Royal Canadian Navy. The visiting ships were:

New York City Fleet Week 2010

The 23rd Fleet Week ran May 26–31, 2010. Visiting ships included:

New York City Fleet Week 2011

The 24th New York Fleet Week was in May 2011. Visiting ships were:

New York City Fleet Week 2012

The 25th New York City Fleet Week was in May 2012. It was also OpSail 2012 in commemoration of the War of 1812. Visiting ships were:
 
 
 
 
 
 
 
 
 
 Brazilian tall ship

New York City Fleet Week 2013

Fleet Week was canceled due to federal budget cuts (sequestration).

New York City Fleet Week 2014

On April 8, 2014, the Navy announced that visiting ships would be:

 
 
  –  was the originally scheduled to attend, but was replaced by McFaul

New York City Fleet Week 2015

On April 13, 2015, the Navy announced that visiting ships would be:

 
 
 
 
 
 USNAS YP-705
 USNAS YP-706
 USNAS YP-707
 USNAS YP-708

New York City Fleet Week 2016

On April 4, 2016, the Navy announced visiting ships would be:

 
 
 
 
 
 
  –  was originally scheduled to attend, but was replaced by Katherine Walker
 
 
 
 USNAS YP-705
 USNAS YP-706
 USNAS YP-707
 USNAS YP-708

New York City Fleet Week 2017

On May 8, 2017, the Navy announced visiting ships would be:

 
 
 
 
 
 
  
 
 
 USNAS YP-705
 USNAS YP-706
 USNAS YP-707
 USNAS YP-708

New York City Fleet Week 2018

On April 12, 2018, the Navy announced visiting ships would be:

 
 
 
 
 
 
  –  was originally scheduled to attend but was replaced by Sturgeon Bay
 
 
 
 USNAS YP-705
 USNAS YP-706
 USNAS YP-707
 USNAS YP-708

New York City Fleet Week 2019

On March 27, 2019, the Navy announced visiting ships would be:

 
 
 
 
 
 
 
 
 
 
 
 USNAS YP-705
 USNAS YP-706
 USNAS YP-707
 USNAS YP-708

New York City Fleet Week 2020

On March 27, 2020, it was announced that the in-person Fleet Week event had been cancelled due to the COVID-19 pandemic. "Virtual Fleet Week," its web-based alternative, attracted over 170,000 unique viewers from May 20–26, 2020.

New York City Fleet Week 2021

On February 8, 2021, it was announced that the in-person Fleet Week event had again been cancelled due to the COVID-19 pandemic. Virtual Fleet Week returned for its second consecutive year.

New York City Fleet Week 2022

On March 16 2022, it was announced that Fleet Week would return after a two year pause due to COVID-19. On April 1 2022, it was announced visiting ships would be:

 
 
 
 
 
 USNAS YP-705
 USNAS YP-706
 USNAS YP-707
 USNAS YP-708

Baltimore
Maryland Fleet Week is an biennial tradition in Baltimore and is managed by Historic Ships in Baltimore.

Maryland Fleet Week and Air Show Baltimore Fleet Week 2018

Ships included:

 
 
 
 
 
 
 
 USACE Catlett
 USACE Reynolds
  (NOAA)
 SV Godspeed
 USNAS YP-705
 USNAS YP-706
 USNAS YP-707
 USNAS YP-708

Maryland Fleet Week and Air Show Baltimore Fleet Week 2022

Ships included:

 
 
 
 
 
 
 
 Danmark
 USNAV YP-705
 USNAV YP-706

Portland
Portland, Oregon includes fleet week as a part of its annual Portland Rose Festival

Portland Fleet Week 1936 
1936 was the first Fleet Week for Portland, although navy ships had visited Portland previously starting in 1892 as part of civic celebrations.

Ships included:

 USS Houston (CA-30)
 USS Milwaukee (CL-5)
 USS Chester (CL-27)
 USS Chicago (CL-29)
 USS Aylwyn (DD-355)
 USS Bainbridge (DD-246)
 USS Chandler (DD-206)
 USS Detroit (CL-8)
 USS Farragut (DD-348)
 USS Goff (DD-247)
 USS Hovey (DD-208)
 USS Hull (DD-350)
 USS Litchfield (DD-336)
 USS Long (DD-209)
 USS Monaghan (DD-354)
 USS Sturdevant (DD-240)
 USS Southard (DD-207)
 USS Worden (DD-352)
 USS Relief (AH-1)

Portland Fleet Week 1937 
Ships included:

 USS Astoria (CA-34)
 USS Chicago (CL-29)
 USS Indianapolis (CA-35)
 USS Louisville (CA-28)
 USS Memphis (CL-13)
 USS Minneapolis (CL-36)
 USS New Orleans (CL-32)
 USS Northampton (CL-26)
 USS Pensacola (CL-24)
 USS Quincy (CA-39)
 USS Richmond (CL-9)
 USS Trenton (CL-11)
 USS Tuscaloosa (CA-37)
 USS Salt Lake City (CL-25)
 USS Pensacola (CL-24)
 USS Brooks (DD-232)
 USS Fox (DD-234)
 USS Goff (DD-247)
 USS Marblehead (CL-12)
 USS Reuben James (DD-245)
 USS Relief (AH-1)
 USS Arctic (AF-7)

Portland Fleet Week 1938 
Ships included:

 USS Chester (CL-27)
 USS Chicago (CL-29)
 USS Indianapolis (CA-35)
 USS Northampton (CL-26)
 USS Pensacola (CL-24)
 USS Salt Lake City (CL-25)
 USS Tuscaloosa (CA-37)
 USS Vincennes (CA-44)
 USS Alywin (DD-355)
 USS Dale (DD-353)
 USS Dewey (DD-349)
 USS Farragut (DD-348)
 USS Hull (DD-350)
 USS Phelps (DD-360)
 USS MacDonough (DD-331)
 USS Monaghan (DD-354)
 USS Worden (DD-352)
 USS Relief (AH-1)
 USS Arctic (AF-7)
 USS Medusa (AR-1)

Portland Fleet Week 2011 
Ships included:

 USS Lake Champlain (CG-57)
 USS Igraham (FFG-61)
 USS McClusky (FFG-41)
 USCGC Active (WMEC-618)
 USCGC Fir (WLB-213)
 USCGC Bluebell (WLI-313)
 USCGC Henry Blake (WLM-563)
 ACOE Redlinger 
 ACOE Essaysons
 HMCS Saskatoon (MM 709)
 HMCS Whitehorse (MM 705)

Portland Fleet Week 2012 
Ships included:

 USS Dewey (DDG-105)
 USS William P. Lawrence (DDG-110)
 USS Ingraham (FFG-61)

Portland Fleet Week 2013 
For 2013 all Fleet Weeks were canceled due to budget issues

Portland Fleet Week 2014 
Ships included:

 USS Lake Champlain (CG-57)
 USS Spruance (DDG-111)
 USCGC Alert (WMEC-630)
 USCGC CuttyHunk (WPB-1322)
 HMCS Oriole (KC 480)

Portland Fleet Week 2015 
Ships included:

 USS Chosin (CG-65)
 USS Cape St. George (CG-71)
 USS Champion (MCM-4)
 USCGC Waesche (WMSL-751)
 USCGC Wahoo (87345)
 USCGC Bluebell (WLI-313)
 USCGC Henry Blake (WLM-563)
 HMCS Calgary (FFH 335)
 HMCS Whitehorse (MM 705)
 HMCS Saskatoon (MM 709)
 HMCS Oriole (KC 480)

Portland Fleet Week 2016 
Ships included:

 USS Russell (DDG-59)
 USS Howard (DDG-83)
 USS Champion (MCM-4)
 USCGC Steadfast (WMEC-623)
 USCGC Swordfish (WPB-87358)
 USCGC Fir (WLB-213)
 USCGC Bluebell (WLI-313)
 HMCS Brandon (MM 710)
 HMCS Edmonton (mm 703)

Portland Fleet Week 2017 
Ships included:

 
 
 
 USCGC Orcas (WPB-1327)

Portland Fleet Week 2018

Ships included:

 
 
 
 
 
  – Decommissioned 2001, in service as a training ship since

Portland Fleet Week 2019

Ships included:

 
 
 
 
 
  – Decommissioned 2001, in service as a training ship since

Portland Fleet Week 2022

Ships included:

Seattle
Seattle, Washington includes fleet week during the annual Seafair. Seattle's Fleet Week was an outgrowth of its "Golden Potlatch" event that started in 1911. The Golden Potlatch was suspended in 1914, but was revived in 1934 as the "Seattle Potlatch of Progress and Fleet Week". This Fleet Week included a number of U.S. Navy ships.

Seattle Fleet Week 2018

Ships included:

Seattle Fleet Week 2019

Ships included:

 
 
 
 
 
 Seattle fireboat Leschi

Los Angeles
The  museum hosts Fleet Week at the Port of Los Angeles in San Pedro

Los Angeles Fleet Week 2017

Los Angeles Fleet Week 2018

Ships included:

Los Angeles Fleet Week 2019

Ships included:

Los Angeles Fleet Week 2022

Ships included:

New London
New London, Connecticut sometimes includes Fleet Week as a part of the Connecticut Maritime Heritage Festival.

New London Fleet Week 2017

Visiting ships included:

New London Fleet Week 2018

Visiting ships included:

New London Fleet Week 2019

Visiting ships included:

Norfolk
Naval Station Norfolk opens to the public and conducts ship tours during its Norfolk Fleet Fest.

Norfolk Fleet Fest 2018

Participating ships included:

Norfolk Fleet Fest 2019

Participating ships included:

San Diego
San Diego annually hosts Fleet Week.

San Diego Fleet Week 2018

Boston
Boston occasionally hosts Fleet Week as a part of larger events and sometimes as a part of their annual Marine Week.

Boston Fleet Week 2012

Ships included:

 
 
 
 
 
 
 
 
 
 
 
 
 
 
 
 
 
 
 
 
 NOAAS Thomas Jefferson (S222)

Boston Fleet Week 2017

Ships included:

 
 
 
 
 
 
 Chilean schooner Esmeralda

New Orleans
New Orleans, though usually as a part of Navy Week, typically has naval vessels take part annually.

New Orleans Navy Week 2022

Ships included:

 
 
 
 FS La Combattante (P735)

Other cities
Fleet Week and similar traditions in other cities include:

 OpSail events are sometimes accompanied by warships and opened to the public in various Fleet Week style events, or sometimes combined.
 Pearl Harbor, Hawaii often hosts ship tours prior to major naval exercises such as RIMPAC

Other countries

Kiel Week
The German city of Kiel annually hosts Kiel Week, largely a sailing event, warships usually take part and open to the public in the same manner as Fleet Week.

Vancouver Fleet Weekend 2022
The city of Vancouver, British Columbia hosted Fleet Weekend for the first time in 2022. Visiting ships were:

See also
Navy Weeks

References

External links

 Fleet Week New York Website
 Fleet Week Port Everglades Website
 San Francisco Fleet Week Website
 San Diego Fleet Week Website
 Seattle Seafair Fleet Week Website
 Fleet Week NYC 2010

Culture of New York City
Culture of San Francisco
Exhibitions in the United States
Festivals in San Diego
Military in the San Francisco Bay Area
United States Navy traditions
United States Coast Guard
United States Marine Corps lore and symbols
Week-long events